Minuscule 391 (in the Gregory-Aland numbering), A128 (Soden), is a Greek minuscule manuscript of the New Testament, on parchment. The text represents the Byzantine textual tradition. It is dated by a colophon to the year 1055. It has marginalia.

Description 

The codex contains the text of the four Gospels on 232 parchment leaves with lacunae (Matthew 1:1-8; Luke 1). It is written in one column per page, in 21 lines per page.

There is also a division according to the Ammonian Sections, with references to the Eusebian Canons (written below Ammonian Section numbers).

Text 

The Greek text of the codex is a representative of the Byzantine text-type. Kurt Aland did not place it in any Category.

According to the Claremont Profile Method it represents textual family Πa in some parts (Luke 1; 10) and family Kx in Luke 20. It belongs to the cluster 178.

The original codex did not contain the Pericope Adulterae (John 7:53-8:11). It was added in the 15th century.

History 

The manuscript is dated by a colophon to the year 1055. It was given to Pope Benedict XIII (1724–1730) by Abbachum Audriani, an abbot of Athos.

The manuscript was added to the list of New Testament manuscripts by Scholz (1794–1852).
It was examined and described by Giuseppe Cozza-Luzi.
C. R. Gregory saw it in 1886.

The manuscript is currently housed at the Vatican Library (Ottob. gr. 432) in Rome.

See also 

 List of New Testament minuscules
 Biblical manuscript
 Textual criticism

References

Further reading 

 

Greek New Testament minuscules
11th-century biblical manuscripts
Manuscripts of the Vatican Library